David Sypolt is a former Republican West Virginia state senator from the 14th district who represented part or all of the following counties: Barbour County, Grant County, Hardy County, Mineral County, Monongalia County, Preston County, Taylor County, and Tucker County. He was elected to his first term in 2006.

Family
Sypolt is married and has three adult children.

Residence
Sypolt currently lives in Kingwood, West Virginia.

Religion
Sypolt is a Baptist Christian.

Education
In 1988 he received his AS in Land Surverying Technology from Glenville State College and years later in 2004, he received his BA from Glenville State College.

Professional experience
Sypolt works as a land surveyor in his professional life.

Organizations
 American Congress on Surveying and Mapping (ACSM);
 National Society of Professional Surveyors (NSPS);
 West Virginia Society of Professional Surveyors (WVSPS);
 National Rifle Association (NRA) - life member;
 West Virginia Citizens Defense League (WVCDL)

See also
List of members of the 79th West Virginia Senate

External links
WV Legislature

References

1964 births
American surveyors
Living people
Politicians from Morgantown, West Virginia
Republican Party West Virginia state senators
21st-century American politicians
Glenville State College alumni
Baptists from West Virginia
People from Kingwood, West Virginia